In electric power transmission, a CIM Profile is a subset model of the CIM UML model. These profiles are designated as parts documents in the IEC 61970 standard by working group 14. Each profile is itself a self-contained model which can be used for generating specific artifacts, such as CIM RDF or XML Schema.

Profile Groups
A CIM Profile Group (e.g., 61970-456 Steady-state Solution Profile Group) is a logical grouping of CIM Profiles. In general, each Parts document encompasses an entire Profile group which has one or more profiles in it.

Standards
 IEC 61970-452 
Equipment Profile
 IEC 61970-453
Schematics Layout Profile
 IEC 61970-456
Analog Measurements Profile
Discrete Measurements Profile
State Variable Profile
Topology Profile

See also
IEC 61970
CIM

External links
CIM EA - A tool written for Enterprise Architect which can manipulate and create profiles.
CIM Tool - A tool written for eclipse that can manipulate and create profiles.
EA schema composer - A tool part of Enterprise Architect which can manipulate and create profiles.

IEC standards
Electric power
Smart grid